In scattering theory, a part of mathematical physics, the Dyson series, formulated by Freeman Dyson, is a perturbative expansion of the time evolution operator in the interaction picture. Each term can be represented by a sum of Feynman diagrams. 

This series diverges asymptotically, but in quantum electrodynamics (QED) at the second order the difference from experimental data is in the order of 10−10. This close agreement holds because the coupling constant  (also known as the fine-structure constant) of QED is much less than 1.

Notice that in this article Planck units are used, so that ħ = 1 (where ħ is the reduced Planck constant).

The Dyson operator 
Suppose that we have a Hamiltonian , which we split into a free part   and an interacting part , i.e. .

We will work in the interaction picture here, that is, 
 
We choose units such that the reduced Planck constant  is 1.

In the interaction picture, the evolution operator  defined by the equation

is called  the  Dyson operator.

We have

and hence the time evolution equation of the propagator:

This is not to be confused with the Tomonaga–Schwinger equation

Consequently:

Which is ultimately a type of Volterra equation

Derivation of the Dyson series 
This leads to the following Neumann series:

Here we have , so we can say that the fields are time-ordered, and  it is useful to introduce an operator   called time-ordering operator, defining

We can now try to make this integration simpler. In fact, by the following example:

Assume that K is symmetric in its arguments and define (look at integration limits):

So it is true that

Returning to our previous integral, the following identity holds

Summing up all the terms, we obtain Dyson's theorem for the Dyson series:

Application on State Vectors 
One can then express the state vector at time t in terms of the state vector at time t0, for t > t0,

Then, the inner product of an initial state (ti = t0) with a final state (tf = t) in the Schrödinger picture, for tf > ti, is as follows:

See also 
Schwinger–Dyson equation
Magnus series
Peano–Baker series
Picard iteration

References 
Charles J. Joachain, Quantum collision theory, North-Holland Publishing, 1975,  (Elsevier)

Scattering theory
Quantum field theory
Freeman Dyson